Up the Garden Path is a 1984 novel by Sue Limb, which was adapted into a radio series by BBC Radio 4, and later into a television sitcom by Granada TV for ITV. Both the radio and television series comprised three seasons, with the radio series originally broadcast in 1987, 1988, and 1993, and the television seasons broadcast in 1990, 1991, and 1993.

The television series has been repeated on the United Kingdom digital channel ITV3. The radio series is regularly repeated on BBC Radio 4 Extra.

Cast
Isabelle 'Izzy' Comyn (Imelda Staunton)
Dick Barnes (Mike Grady)
Maria Shadwell (Tessa Peake-Jones, television; Marty Cruickshank, radio)
Gwyn Jenkins (Tom Mannion, television; Sion Probert and Dafydd Hywel, radio)
Michael Tristram (Nicholas Le Prevost)
Louise Tristram (Susan Kyd, television; Phyllida Nash, radio)
Roger 'Razors' Razebrook (René Zagger)
Charles Armstrong (David Robb) appeared in Series 2
Bill Bailey (Neil McCaul) appeared in Series 2, 3
Linda (Adrienne O'Sullivan) appeared in Series 3
5C pupil (Siobhan Hayes) appeared in Series 2, 3
Vincent (Kevin Treasure) appeared in Series 2, 3

Episodes

Radio
 Series 1 (1987)
 Episode 1: "New Year, Old Problems"
 Episode 2: "Tangled Webs"
 Episode 3: "Punch Ups and Put Downs"
 Episode 4: "Into the Lion's Den"
 Episode 5: "The Menage"
 Episode 6: "Over and Out"

 Series 2 (1988)
 Episode 1: "Arrivals and Departures"
 Episode 2: "Hot Water"
 Episode 3: "A Soft-Hearted Little Thing"
 Episode 4: "The View from the Bridge"
 Episode 5: "On the Side of the Angels"
 Episode 6: "You Shall Go to the Ball"
 Episode 7: "The More the Merrier"
 Episode 8: "Love's Labours"

Series 3 (1993)
 Episode 1: "New Men"
 Episode 2: "Gooseberries and Fools"
 Episode 3: "Over-Drawn, Over-Sexed and Over-Optimistic"
 Episode 4: "Talking It on the Chin"
 Episode 5: "Up the Stick and Sick as a Parrot"
 Episode 6: "A Dick in Shining Armour"

Television

Series 1 (1990)

Series 2 (1991)

Series 3 (1993)

Reception
Critical reception was mixed. Writing in The Daily Mirror, television editor Tony Pratt called the first series 'one of the best [sitcoms] ITV has produced for ages. It's lively, adult and funny'.

However, The Guardian felt 'sorry for Imelda Staunton...who deserves a better script' with Hugh Hebert labelling the series 'dire' and referring to the character of Izzy as a 'caricature witless teacher who was God's promo for Baker MacGregor Re-Education Inc.'

References

External links

1984 British novels
1990 British television series debuts
1993 British television series endings
1990s British sitcoms
BBC Radio comedy programmes
ITV sitcoms
Television series by ITV Studios
Television shows produced by Granada Television
English-language television shows